CBB Bancorp, Inc. operates as the holding company for Commonwealth Business Bank that provides commercial and personal banking services in the United States. CBB Bank has eight retail branches in California and Texas. It is one of five major Korean American banks in the United States.

History
Commonwealth Business Bank, as well known as CBB Bank, was founded on March 9, 2005 in Los Angeles, California with only 20 employees and $23.1 million of capital. It had its first stock traded on March 21 of that same year. It got TARP CPP Redemption on July 22, 2013 and had total assets of over $1 billion as of July 31, 2017. On September 1, 2017, it formed CBB Bancorp.

Services 
The bank offers checking, installment, savings, money market, and certification of deposit accounts, as well as IRAs; business line of credit, term loans, trade finance, professional loans, business property loans, commercial real estate loans, and construction loans; SBA loans; and debit and credit cards. The company also provides treasury management, mobile and online banking, wire transfer, telephone banking, safe deposit box, and lockbox services.

References

External links
 Official website

Banks established in 2005
Banks based in California
Companies based in Los Angeles
Korean-American culture in Los Angeles
Korean American banks